Applied Cognitive Psychology is a bimonthly peer-reviewed scientific journal covering experimental research in cognitive psychology. It was established in 1987 and is published by John Wiley & Sons. The founding editors-in-chief were Douglas Herrmann and Graham M. Davies, and the current one is Pär Anders Granhag (University of Gothenburg). According to the Journal Citation Reports, the journal has a 2018 impact factor of 1.552, ranking it 61st out of 88 journals in the category "Psychology, Experimental".

References

External links

Psychology journals
Cognitive psychology